Bron-Yr-Aur (Welsh for "breast of the gold", or by extension, "hill of the gold" or "golden hill") is a privately owned 18th-century cottage, on the outskirts of Machynlleth, in Montgomeryshire, mid-Wales, best known for its association with the English rock band Led Zeppelin. In 1970, both Jimmy Page and Robert Plant went there, and wrote many of the tracks that appeared on the band's third and fourth studio albums.

Overview 

The cottage was used as a holiday home during the 1950s by the family of future Led Zeppelin vocalist Robert Plant. In 1970, Plant and guitarist Jimmy Page spent time there after a long and gruelling concert tour of North America. Though the cottage had no running water or electricity, they used it as a retreat to write and record some of their third album, Led Zeppelin III. People at the cottage during this time were Plant's wife Maureen and 18-month-old daughter Carmen, Page's girlfriend Charlotte Martin, and Led Zeppelin roadies Clive Coulson and Sandy MacGregor.

Page has explained that:

According to the guitarist, the time spent at Bron-Yr-Aur in 1970

Led Zeppelin songs that can be traced to Plant and Page's time at Bron-Yr-Aur in 1970 include "Over the Hills and Far Away" and "The Crunge" (both from Houses of the Holy), "The Rover", "Bron-Yr-Aur" and "Down by the Seaside" (from Physical Graffiti), "Poor Tom" (from Coda) and three they actually used on Led Zeppelin III: "Friends", "Bron-Y-Aur Stomp" and "That's the Way". There were also two songs recorded, called "Another Way To Wales" and "I Wanna Be Her Man", which never found their way onto an official Led Zeppelin album. A primitive recording of the latter of these can be heard on bootleg label Antrabata's studio outtakes sessions.

When on-stage for Page and Plant's Unledded reunion in 1994, Plant announced to the audience that Page's daughter, Scarlet Page, was conceived "about half an hour" after "That's the Way" was written at Bron-Yr-Aur.

Led Zeppelin used the name of the house in the title of their songs: "Bron-Y-Aur Stomp" (the name of the house being accidentally misspelled on the album cover), and "Bron-Yr-Aur". "Bron-Y-Aur Stomp" is a country music-inflected hoedown on Led Zeppelin III, in which Robert Plant sings about walking in the woods with Strider, his blue-eyed merle dog. An earlier, full-electric instrumental version of this song is "Jennings Farm Blues", recorded at Olympic Studios in 1969 and included on a bootleg album of studio outtakes, Studio Gems. In contrast to (and not to be confused with) "Bron-Y-Aur Stomp", the track "Bron-Yr-Aur" is a gentle, acoustic instrumental played by Page on six-string guitar; it appeared on the later album Physical Graffiti, and in the films Almost Famous and The Song Remains the Same.

On 16 June 2016, Page testified under oath, due to the legal proceedings regarding the rights to the song, that he wrote the acoustic guitar intro to "Stairway to Heaven" at Headley Grange, and not at Bron-Yr-Aur.

References

External links

 
 BBC article about Bron-Yr-Aur, 18 April 2015

Led Zeppelin
Pennal
Houses in Gwynedd
Houses in Snowdonia
Grade II listed buildings in Gwynedd

sv:Bron-Yr-Aur